Mohamed Henkouche (born 20 February 1948) is a retired Algerian football midfielder and later manager.

References

1948 births
Living people
People from Mascara, Algeria
Algerian footballers
Algeria international footballers
GC Mascara players
USM Bel Abbès players
Association football midfielders
Algerian expatriate footballers
Expatriate footballers in France
Algerian expatriate sportspeople in France
Algerian football managers
ES Mostaganem managers
GC Mascara managers
ASM Oran managers
MC Oran managers
CS Constantine managers
AS Djerba managers
MC Alger managers
MO Constantine managers
US Biskra managers
MC Saïda managers
WA Boufarik managers
CR Belouizdad managers
MSP Batna managers
CA Bordj Bou Arréridj managers
WA Tlemcen managers
USM Annaba managers
JSM Tiaret managers
JS Saoura managers
RC Relizane managers
MO Béjaïa managers
USM Blida managers
Algerian expatriate football managers
Expatriate football managers in Morocco
Algerian expatriate sportspeople in Morocco
Expatriate football managers in Tunisia
Algerian expatriate sportspeople in Tunisia
21st-century Algerian people